Zaur Gurbanli (born on January 12, 1987, Baku) - is a youth activist, co-founder and ex-board member of N!DA Civic Movement from February 2011 to December 12, 2012, projects coordinator and ex-Senior official for the arrested members` rights in 2013. He is known for his arrest on April 1, 2013 a few days after the protests held in Baku against the non-combat deaths in the military. Zaur was accused in bogus charges as keeping illegal fire-arm and acquiring explosive substance and devices. International human rights organization, Amnesty International recognized him as a prisoner of conscience. He was sentenced to 8 years of imprisonment on May 6, 2014, but later was pardoned and released on December 30, 2014 after 1 year 9 months imprisonment.

Education

He has got his secondary education at school number 17 in Shaki, then he continued his education at Shaki Mathematics and Physics School. During these years he took the first place for several times in the competitions on History. He completed school with an honors diploma.

In 2003, he was admitted to Baku State University to the Law faculty with a score of 665 points out of 700. He graduated from the university in 2007 and in the same year was called up for the military service.

Career 

From 2008 Gurbanli has worked as a lawyer in different institutions, but because of his political views he was dismissed.

Activity 

He was one of the establishers of N!DA Civic Movement founded in February, 2011. Within the tenure of his activity in this organization he was selected to the Board for twice and was projects coordinator here.

Moreover, Gurbanli is a member of Free Writers’ House since January 12, 2013.

Meanwhile, Zaur Gurbanli was blogger and on September 29, 2012 he was detained by people in civic gears presenting themselves as officials of Department for Combating Organized Crime because of his political activity and Absheron district court made a decision to administrative arrest for 15 days according to article 310.1 of the Administrative offences Code of the Azerbaijan Republic.

On April 1, 2013 Zaur Gurbanli was arrested as a result of repression of the government against to N!DA Civic Movement and he was taken away to the investigatory department of Grave Crimes of Head Procurator’s office. Then he was led to Nasimi district Court and was accused under 228.3 article of the Criminal Code of the Azerbaijan Republic (organized keeping illegal fire-arm and acquiring explosive substance and devices). Preventive punishment of three months was chosen for him as a mean of penalty.

References

See also 
Nida Civic Movement
Rashadat Akhundov
Uzeyir Mammadli
Rashad Hasanov

1987 births
Living people
Azerbaijani democracy activists
Amnesty International prisoners of conscience held by Azerbaijan
Azerbaijani prisoners and detainees
Baku State University alumni
Lawyers from Baku